Willie Tokataake  (born in Abemama) is an I-Kiribati politician, former Minister for Information, Communications, Transport and Tourism development until July 2020.

Willie Tokataake (Abemama) was Minister of Education, Science and Technology in the first Teburoro Tito’s cabinet from 1994 to 1998.

References

Living people
Members of the House of Assembly (Kiribati)
People from the Gilbert Islands
21st-century I-Kiribati politicians
Government ministers of Kiribati
United Coalition Party politicians
Tobwaan Kiribati Party politicians
Year of birth missing (living people)